The Edmonton Wildcats (formerly the Edmonton Maple Leafs) are Canadian football team based in Edmonton, Alberta. The Wildcats play in the Prairie Football Conference, which is part of the Canadian Junior Football League and competes for the league championship, the Canadian Bowl. The team was founded in 1948.

History

The team was founded as the Edmonton Maple Leafs in 1948, as a member of the Alberta Junior Football League (which was a conference in the Canadian Junior Football League). The Maple Leafs lost the 1951 National Final to the Hamilton Tigers. 1952 marked the second appearance of the Edmonton Wildcats in the national final, resulting in a narrow loss to Windsor AKO Fratmen. In 1958 the team's colors were changed to blue and white from green and gold. Due to the construction of the Commonwealth Stadium in 1976 on the site of the old Wildcat practice field, the Wildcats took up residence at Tiger Goldstick Park in Southeast Edmonton. The team would play its regular season games at Emerald Hills Football Field. The Wildcats have been successful in three appearances in the national final. In 1967 they defeated the Burlington Braves in Regina, Saskatchewan . In 1977, the Wildcats defeated the Hamilton Hurricanes in Hamilton, Ontario and in 1983 defeated the Ottawa Sooners in Windsor, Ontario. In 1994, the team moved to its current practice field, Rundle Park. The team made it to the 2006 Canadian Bowl, but lost to the Vancouver Island Raiders. They also were runner up in the 2009 championship game.

Gallery

References

External links
Edmonton Wildcats official site
Canadian Junior Football League

Wild
Canadian Junior Football League teams
Sports clubs established in 1948
1948 establishments in Alberta